Russkaia Starina (pronounced ) was a Russian history journal published monthly in St. Petersburg by amateur historian Mikhail Semevsky and his successors between 1870 and 1916. Its authors included Ivan Zabelin, Dmitry Ilovaysky, Nikolai Karlovich Shilder, and Mykola Kostomarov. A collected edition was reprinted in 2008.

Semevsky was highly enthusiastic about the history of 18th-century Russia. His journal covered the imperial period of Russian history, including the era of palace revolutions. It was Russkaia Starina that first brought to light the unpublished pages of Eugene Onegin and Dead Souls, Bolotov's memoirs, Kuchelbecker's diary, and many other materials long forgotten or repressed by censorship. Semevsky personally persuaded numerous old nobles and bureaucrats to put their reminiscences into writing.

In the late 1870s another amateur historian, Sergei Shubinsky, set up a rival publication, The Historical Herald.

References

External links 
 A collection of digitized copies
 

Defunct magazines published in Russia
History magazines
Magazines established in 1870
Magazines disestablished in 1916
Magazines published in Saint Petersburg
Magazines published in Russia
Russian-language magazines
Monthly magazines published in Russia